Richard Randolph Grigg (8 June 1885 – 12 November 1972) was an Australian rules footballer for the Geelong Football Club in the Victorian Football League, now Australian Football League. He was named in Geelong's Team of the Century, won the Geelong Best and Fairest award four times (1910, 1911, 1912 and 1914) and in 2007 was elevated to legend status in the Geelong Hall of Fame.  He represented Victoria in interstate matches on nine occasions. Grigg was a brilliant utility who was skilled in all facets of the game, he was a brilliant high mark and possessed fine anticipation, great style and plenty of dash. He was regarded as one of the VFL's most accomplished and fairest players. Grigg played 130 consecutive matches between 1904 - 14 a Geelong record.  After seven years out of VFL circles he made a brief comeback to play the final two matches of 1921, at the age of 35. Captain of 2 matches.

References

External links

1885 births
1972 deaths
People educated at Geelong College
Australian rules footballers from Victoria (Australia)
Australian Rules footballers: place kick exponents
Geelong Football Club players
Carji Greeves Medal winners